Looking for Comedy in the Muslim World is a 2005 film starring and directed by Albert Brooks. It was shown at the Dubai International Film Festival.

Synopsis
Albert Brooks, a Jewish-American comedian, is asked by the United States government to travel to India and Pakistan to find out "what makes Muslims laugh."  References are made to Brooks's earlier films, including Finding Nemo, Lost In America and Defending Your Life, along with his earlier stand-up comedy material.

Upon reaching India, Brooks begins interviewing Indians and gathering material for the 500-page essay expected of him from the government. He is aided by two agents (who actually help very little) and an Indian woman named Maya (Sheetal Sheth), who was hired as his assistant.

Brooks' interviews and a failed stand-up performance begin to attract the attention of the Indian government, who fear he is a spy of some sort. Unable to get a visa, Brooks illegally enters Pakistan for four hours to interview several fledgling Pakistani comedians, the Indian government becomes even more paranoid, increasing border control. This action causes alarm to Pakistan, who responds with security measures of their own.

As tension between the countries grows, the American government orders Brooks to leave the country and return to America. It is later said that the tension between Pakistan and India is resolved after they learn that everything was Brooks' fault. It is also revealed that Maya sent what was written of the report to Washington, but it received no recognition.

Cast
 Albert Brooks as Himself
 Amy Ryan as Emily
 Sheetal Sheth as Maya
 Fred Dalton Thompson as Himself
 Penny Marshall as Herself
 Marco Khan as Pakistani Comedian

Reception
The film received mixed reviews from critics. According to Rotten Tomatoes, it holds a 42% rating based on one hundred-nine reviews. The site's consensus states: "Although the premise seems ripe for laughs, Albert Brooks isn't ruthless or clever enough to pull it off." It opened in limited release (in only 161 theatres). However, some critics appreciated Brooks's sly satire. As Nathan Rabin wrote in The A.V. Club, "Looking succeeds smashingly both as a comedy and as a savvy deconstruction of comedy. It's equally concerned with getting laughs and exploring how culture and language affect the way people process humor."

See also
Humour in Islam

References

External links
 
 

2005 films
2005 comedy films
American comedy films
American political satire films
Films directed by Albert Brooks
Warner Independent Pictures films
Shangri-La Entertainment films
Films with screenplays by Albert Brooks
Films scored by Michael Giacchino
Islamic comedy and humor
Films about actors
Films about Islam
2000s English-language films
2000s American films